In the 1857 United Kingdom general election, the Whigs, led by Lord Palmerston, won a majority in the House of Commons as the Conservative vote fell significantly.  The election had been provoked by a vote of censure in Palmerston's government over his approach to the Arrow affair which led to the Second Opium War. 

There is no separate tally of votes or seats for the Peelites. They did not contest elections as an organised party but more as independent Free trade Conservatives with varying degrees of distance from the two main parties.

According to A. J. P. Taylor:
The general election of 1857 is unique in our history: the only election ever conducted as a simple plebiscite in favour of an individual. Even the "coupon" election of 1918 claimed to be more than a plebiscite for Lloyd George; even Disraeli and Gladstone offered a clash of policies as well as of personalities. In 1857 there was no issue before the electorate except whether Palmerston should be Prime Minister; and no one could pretend that Palmerston had any policy except to be himself.

Results

|}

Summary

Seats summary

See also
 List of MPs elected in the 1857 United Kingdom general election
 1857 United Kingdom general election in Ireland

Notes

References

Further reading

External links
1857 General Election
Spartacus: Political Parties and Election Results

 
1857 elections in the United Kingdom
General election
1857
March 1857 events
April 1857 events